Gavin Maxwell (born August 28, 1970) is a Canadian sprint canoer who competed in the mid-1990s. He was eliminated in the semifinals of the C-1 1000 m event at the 1996 Summer Olympics in Atlanta.  He is now a chiropractor in Mississauga, Ontario.

References

1970 births
Canadian male canoeists
Canoeists at the 1996 Summer Olympics
Living people
Olympic canoeists of Canada